The Hunters are a Canadian punk rock band from Quebec City. Since their formation in 2006, The Hunters have toured extensively in Canada, as well as the US East Coast and Europe.

History
Their first full-length, Dissent Lasts..., has been released independently in 2008.

In June 2010, Alexandre Hébert-Vincent was replaced by Danahé Rousseau-Côté on the guitar.

On March 8, 2012, Stomp Records announced they were adding the band to their roster and releasing the second album, Promises, on April 17.

The music video for the first single off Promises, "Van Party Forever" was released on June 5 and features the band playing with The Sainte Catherines during their farewell tour.

The foursome toured and promoted their latest album in the United States in November and December 2012. They played their 300th show in September, just before their performance at The Fest in Gainesville, Florida on October 26.

The second music video, "Faux-Fire, Faux-Gold", consists of footage of the band during the trip to The Fest and the car ride back to dodge Hurricane Sandy.

A documentary webseries about Promises promotional tour was released in January 2013. Titled Driving on Promises, the ten episodes cover the whole tour through Quebec and Ontario. It is based on their roadie's log book.

The foursome toured Europe in February and March 2013, more precisely through Austria, Czech Republic, France, Germany and Switzerland.

They started recording their third studio album on June 18, 2013 with Matt Allison at Atlas Studios in Chicago, Illinois. The title, Art Electric, has been revealed on the Indiegogo funding page mid-June.

Members
Dominic Pelletier (Guitar, vocals)
Raphaël Potvin (Bass)
William Duguay-Drouin (drums)

Past members
Danahé Rousseau-Côté (Guitar)

Discography

Albums
Dissent Lasts... (Self-released, 2008)
Promises (Stomp Records, 2012)
Art Electric (Stomp Records/Black Numbers/Flix Records, 2013)

EPs
Split with Miracles (L'Écurie, 2013)

Videography

Music videos
"Sing Out!" (2010)
"Van Party Forever" (2012)
"Faux-Fire, Faux-Gold" (2012)

Documentary
"Driving on Promises" (2013)

References

External links
The Hunters official website
The Hunters on Bandcamp
The Hunters at Myspace
The Hunters on Twitter
The Hunters on YouTube
Interview with QuebecPunkScene.net

Musical groups established in 2006
Musical groups from Quebec City
Canadian punk rock groups
2006 establishments in Quebec